Stan Cassin (born February 19, 1935) was a provincial politician in Alberta, Canada.

Political career
Cassin was elected to the Legislative Assembly of Alberta from the Calgary North West electoral district in the 1986 Alberta general election as the Progressive Conservative candidate, winning in a landslide. Cassin ran for a second term in the 1989 Alberta general election but was defeated by Frank Bruseker of the Liberals. He lost by almost 500 votes after receiving almost 800 fewer votes than in the previous election.

References

External links
Legislative Assembly of Alberta Members Listing

Progressive Conservative Association of Alberta MLAs
Living people
1935 births